In philosophy, objectivity is the concept of truth independent from individual subjectivity (bias caused by one's perception, emotions, or imagination). A proposition is considered to have objective truth when its truth conditions are met without bias caused by the mind of a sentient being. Scientific objectivity refers to the ability to judge without partiality or external influence. Objectivity in the moral framework calls for moral codes to be assessed based on the well-being of the people in the society that follow it. Moral objectivity also calls for moral codes to be compared to one another through a set of universal facts and not through subjectivity.

Objectivity of knowledge

Plato considered geometry to be a condition of idealism concerned with universal truth.  In Republic, Socrates opposes the sophist Thrasymachus's relativistic account of justice, and argues that justice is mathematical in its conceptual structure, and that ethics was therefore a precise and objective enterprise with impartial standards for truth and correctness, like geometry. The rigorous mathematical treatment Plato gave to moral concepts set the tone for the western tradition of moral objectivism that came after him. His contrasting between objectivity and opinion became the basis for philosophies intent on resolving the questions of reality, truth, and existence. He saw opinions as belonging to the shifting sphere of sensibilities, as opposed to a fixed, eternal and knowable incorporeality. Where Plato distinguished between how we know things and their ontological status, subjectivism such as George Berkeley's depends on perception. In Platonic terms, a criticism of subjectivism is that it is difficult to distinguish between knowledge, opinions, and subjective knowledge.

Platonic idealism is a form of metaphysical objectivism, holding that the ideas exist independently from the individual. Berkeley's empirical idealism, on the other hand, holds that things only exist as they are perceived. Both approaches boast an attempt at objectivity. Plato's definition of objectivity can be found in his epistemology, which is based on mathematics, and his metaphysics, where knowledge of the ontological status of objects and ideas is resistant to change.

In opposition to philosopher René Descartes' method of personal deduction, natural philosopher Isaac Newton applied the relatively objective scientific method to look for evidence before forming a hypothesis. Partially in response to Kant's rationalism, logician Gottlob Frege applied objectivity to his epistemological and metaphysical philosophies. If reality exists independently of consciousness, then it would logically include a plurality of indescribable forms. Objectivity requires a definition of truth formed by propositions with truth value. An attempt of forming an objective construct incorporates ontological commitments to the reality of objects.

The importance of perception in evaluating and understanding objective reality is debated in the observer effect of quantum mechanics. Direct or naïve realists rely on perception as key in observing objective reality, while instrumentalists hold that observations are useful in predicting objective reality. The concepts that encompass these ideas are important in the philosophy of science. Philosophies of mind explore whether objectivity relies on perceptual constancy.

Objectivity in ethics

Ethical subjectivism

The term "ethical subjectivism" covers two distinct theories in ethics. According to cognitive versions of ethical subjectivism, the truth of moral statements depends upon people's values, attitudes, feelings, or beliefs. Some forms of cognitivist ethical subjectivism can be counted as forms of realism, others are forms of anti-realism. David Hume is a foundational figure for cognitive ethical subjectivism. On a standard interpretation of his theory, a trait of character counts as a moral virtue when it evokes a sentiment of approbation in a sympathetic, informed, and rational human observer. Similarly, Roderick Firth's ideal observer theory held that right acts are those that an impartial, rational observer would approve of. William James, another ethical subjectivist, held that an end is good (to or for a person) just in the case it is desired by that person (see also ethical egoism). According to non-cognitive versions of ethical subjectivism, such as emotivism, prescriptivism, and expressivism, ethical statements cannot be true or false, at all: rather, they are expressions of personal feelings or commands. For example, on A. J. Ayer's emotivism, the statement, "Murder is wrong" is equivalent in meaning to the emotive, "Murder, Boo!"

Ethical objectivism

According to the ethical objectivist, the truth or falsehood of typical moral judgments does not depend upon the beliefs or feelings of any person or group of persons. This view holds that moral propositions are analogous to propositions about chemistry, biology, or history, in so much as they are true despite what anyone believes, hopes, wishes, or feels. When they fail to describe this mind-independent moral reality, they are false—no matter what anyone believes, hopes, wishes, or feels.

There are many versions of ethical objectivism, including various religious views of morality, Platonistic intuitionism, Kantianism, utilitarianism, and certain forms of ethical egoism and contractualism. Note that Platonists define ethical objectivism in an even more narrow way, so that it requires the existence of intrinsic value. Consequently, they reject the idea that contractualists or egoists could be ethical objectivists. Objectivism, in turn, places primacy on the origin of the frame of reference—and, as such, considers any arbitrary frame of reference ultimately a form of ethical subjectivism by a transitive property, even when the frame incidentally coincides with reality and can be used for measurements.

Moral objectivism and relativism
Moral objectivism is the view that what is right or wrong doesn't depend on what anyone thinks is right or wrong. Moral objectivism depends on how the moral code affects the well-being of the people of the society. Moral objectivism allows for moral codes to be compared to each other through a set of universal facts than mores of a society. Nicholas Reschar defines mores as customs within every society (i.e. what women can wear) and states that moral codes cannot be compared to one's personal moral compass. An example is the categorical imperative of  Immanuel Kant which says: "Act only according to that maxim [i.e., rule] whereby you can at the same time will that it become a universal law." John Stuart Mill was a consequential thinker and therefore proposed utilitarianism which asserts that in any situation, the right thing to do is whatever is likely to produce the most happiness overall. Moral relativism is the view where a moral code is relative to an agent in their specific moral context. The rules within moral codes are equal to each other and are only deemed "right" or "wrong" within their specific moral codes. Relativism is opposite to Universalism because there is not a single moral code for every agent to follow. Relativism differs from Nihilism because it validates every moral code that exists whereas nihilism does not. When it comes to relativism, Russian philosopher and writer, Fyodor Dostoevsky, coined the phrase "If God doesn't exist, everything is permissible". That phrase was his view of the consequences for rejecting theism as a basis of ethics. American anthropologist Ruth Benedict argued that there is no single objective morality and that morality varies with culture.

Objectivity in history
History as a discipline has wrestled with notions of objectivity from its very beginning. While its object of study is commonly thought to be the past, the only thing historians have to work with are different versions of stories based on individual perceptions of reality and memory.

Several history streams developed to devise ways to solve this dilemma: Historians like Leopold von Ranke (19th century) have advocated for the use of extensive evidence –especially archived physical paper documents– to recover the bygone past, claiming that, as opposed to people's memories, objects remain stable in what they say about the era they witnessed, and therefore represent a better insight into objective reality. In the 20th century, the Annales School emphasized the importance of shifting focus away from the perspectives of influential men –usually politicians around whose actions narratives of the past were shaped–, and putting it on the voices of ordinary people. Postcolonial streams of history challenge the colonial-postcolonial dichotomy and critique Eurocentric academia practices, such as the demand for historians from colonized regions to anchor their local narratives to events happening in the territories of their colonizers to earn credibility.
All the streams explained above try to uncover whose voice is more or less truth-bearing and how historians can stitch together versions of it to best explain what "actually happened."

The anthropologist Michel-Rolph Trouillot developed the concepts of historicity 1 and 2 to explain the difference between the materiality of socio-historical processes (H1) and the narratives that are told about the materiality of socio-historical processes (H2). This distinction hints that H1 would be understood as the factual reality that elapses and is captured with the concept of "objective truth", and that H2 is the collection of subjectivities that humanity has stitched together to grasp the past. Debates about positivism, relativism, and postmodernism are relevant to evaluating these concepts' importance and the distinction between them.

Ethical considerations
In his book "Silencing the past", Trouillot wrote about the power dynamics at play in history-making, outlining four possible moments in which historical silences can be created: (1) making of sources (who gets to know how to write, or to have possessions that are later examined as historical evidence), (2) making of archives (what documents are deemed important to save and which are not, how to classify materials, and how to order them within physical or digital archives), (3) making of narratives (which accounts of history are consulted, which voices are given credibility), and (4) the making of history (the retrospective construction of what The Past is).

Because history (official, public, familial, personal) informs current perceptions and how we make sense of the present, whose voice gets to be included in it –and how– has direct consequences in material socio-historical processes.
Thinking of current historical narratives as impartial depictions of the totality of events unfolded in the past by labeling them as "objective" risks sealing historical understanding. Acknowledging that history is never objective and always incomplete has a meaningful opportunity to support social justice efforts. Under said notion, voices that have been silenced are placed on an equal footing to the grand and popular narratives of the world, appreciated for their unique insight of reality through their subjective lens.

See also

Factual relativism
Journalistic objectivity
Naïve realism
Objectivity (science)
Objectivism
Omniscience

References

Further reading
Bachelard, Gaston. La formation de l'esprit scientifique: contribution à une psychanalyse de la connaissance. Paris: Vrin, 2004. .
Castillejo, David. The Formation of Modern Objectivity. Madrid: Ediciones de Arte y Bibliofilia, 1982.
Gaukroger, Stephen. (2012). Objectivity. Oxford University Press.
Kuhn, Thomas S. The Structure of Scientific Revolutions. Chicago: University of Chicago Press, 1996, 3rd ed. .
Megill, Allan. Rethinking Objectivity. London: Duke UP, 1994.
Nagel, Ernest. The Structure of Science. New York: Brace and World, 1961.
Nagel, Thomas. The View from Nowhere. Oxford: Oxford UP, 1986
Nozick, Robert. Invariances: the structure of the objective world. Cambridge: Harvard UP, 2001.
Popper, Karl. R. Objective Knowledge: An Evolutionary Approach. Oxford University Press, 1972. .
Rescher, Nicholas. Objectivity: the obligations of impersonal reason. Notre Dame: Notre Dame Press, 1977.
Rorty, Richard. Objectivity, Relativism, and Truth. Cambridge: Cambridge University Press, 1991
Rousset, Bernard. La théorie kantienne de l'objectivité, Paris: Vrin, 1967.
Scheffler, Israel. Science and Subjectivity. Hackett, 1982. Voices of Wisdom; a multicultural philosophy reader. Kessler

External links

Subjectivity and Objectivity—by Pete Mandik

Articles containing video clips
Concepts in epistemology
Concepts in ethics
Concepts in metaphysics
Ontology
Philosophy of history
Philosophy of science
Political philosophy
Reality
Truth
Virtue